Krødsherad (Krødsherad kommune) is a municipality in Viken county, Norway.  The administrative centre of the municipality is the village of Noresund. The municipality of Krødsherad was established when it was separated from the municipality of Sigdal on 1 January 1901.

General information

Name
The Old Norse form of the name was Krœðisherað. The first element is the genitive case of the name of the lake Krøderen, the last element is herað meaning "district". Prior to 1918, the name was spelled Krødsherred.

Coat-of-arms
The coat-of-arms is from modern times. They were granted on 11 September 1981.  The arms are supposedly canting arms. In older times, the name, Krødsherad, was commonly misunderstood as the word kross meaning "cross" or the area where two valleys crossed. Thus the saltire cross was taken as a symbol in the arms. New insights, however, derive the name from Krøderen, or a lake with a sharp curve (hooked-lake).

Geography
The district lies on the Krøderfjord in Hallingdal, and borders on the municipalities of Ringerike, Flå, Sigdal and Modum. The municipality lies only 10 old Norwegian miles from Oslo. Settlement is scattered, with some concentration around the municipality's two principal centers, Noresund situated on the east side of Lake Krøderen and Krøderen at the southern end of Lake Krøderen.

Economy
Agriculture is the primary industry with most agricultural land arable and mostly used for grain cultivation. The forestry industry also has historically been important. With the shoreline at Krøderen and the high mountains at Norefjell, the municipality enjoys a spectrum of natural environments from lake to mountain. As a result, there are many vacation homes in the municipality and tourism, especially winter sports in the Norefjell area, is an important contribution element in the economy.

Attractions

Villa Fridheim

Villa Fridheim, a manor house which houses a folk museum, is one of Norway's largest timber buildings. The style is representative of romantic nationalism. The building was erected in 1890-92 as the country house of Drammen based timber merchant Svend Haug(1832-1891) and his wife Anne Marthea (Thea) Sveaas (1839-1924). The architect was Herman Major Backer (1856–1932), whose other commissions included Skaugum in Asker, Klemetsrud Church in Oslo,  Sollihøgda Chapel in Hole and  St John's Church in Bergen.

The building functioned as a hotel and boarding house between 1914-60. The building was restored and opened as a folktale museum in the summer of 1986. In 1996 the museum opened a section dedicated to the great collectors of Norwegian fairy tales, Peter Christen Asbjørnsen and Jørgen Moe and to noted illustrators Theodor Kittelsen and Christian Skredsvig.

Krøderbanen 
Krøderbanen Museum (Museet Krøderbanen) is a railroad museum headquartered in the former Krøderen Railroad Station at Krøderen. Krøderbanen was opened in 1872 as a narrow gauge line. It was converted to standard gauge in connection with the Bergen Railway opening in 1909 and remained in operation until 1985. Both rolling stock and fixed installations along the line is kept in running condition. Krøderbanen is also a center for the restoration and maintenance of railway equipment.

Norefjell Ski Resort
Norefjell Ski Resort was host to the downhill and giant slalom competitions of the 1952 Winter Olympics. Norefjell is only a 90-minute drive away from Oslo, making the ski resort the closest high mountain area to the Norwegian capital.

Olberg Church  
Olberg Church  (Olberg kirke)  dates from 1859. Jørgen Moe, who was the chaplain  from 1853 to 1863, committed himself to having a new church built at Krødsherad.  It was constructed based upon designs by architect  Gustav Adolph Lammers. The building was built of wood and has 600 seats. The new church was dedicated on October 19, 1859. It is part of the Church of Norway  and belongs to Eiker Prosti in the Diocese of Tunsberg.

Notable people 

 Niels Schultz (1780 in Krødsherad – 1832) a Norwegian cleric, author and politician
 Amund Ringnes (1840 in Krødsherad – 1907) brewery owner, founded Ringnes AS in 1876 
 Moltke Moe (1859 in Krødsherad - 1913) a Norwegian folklorist
 Sigurd Moen (1897 in Krødsherad – 1967) speed skater, bronze medallist at the 1924 Winter Olympics
 Tormod Skagestad (1920 in Krødsherad – 1997) poet, novelist, playwright, actor and theatre director
 Otto Tschudi (born 1949 near Krødsherad) alpine skier, participated at the 1968 and 1972 Winter Olympics

External links

Krødsherad kommune website
Villa Fridheim website
Museet Krøderbanen website
Norefjell website

Municipal fact sheet from Statistics Norway

References

 
Municipalities of Buskerud
Municipalities of Viken (county)
Ringerike (traditional district)